Thomas A. Johnston (1848-1934), was president of the Kemper Family School and Kemper Military School in Boonville, Missouri from 1881 to 1928.  He was known as the "Builder of Kemper".

Johnston was born near Boonville in 1848.  He joined the Confederate Army in October 1864, and served under General John Marmaduke and General Sterling Price through the end of the war.  After the war, Johnston studied for two years at a private academy in Prairie Home, Missouri before entering the Kemper Family School in fall 1867.  He studied under Professor Frederick T. Kemper until 1871, then was admitted to the senior class of the University of Missouri.  A year later, he was back at the Kemper School as an instructor with an A.B. from Missouri.

Following the death of the school founder in 1881, T.A. Johnston was named Kemper president and placed in control of the school. Under Johnston's leadership, the school  significantly changed.  Although Frederick Kemper was the founder of the school, Colonel Johnston guided the school through its largest period of growth and established its national reputation.  

Under Johnston's leadership, most of the buildings on campus were constructed.  He also made the seminal decision to convert Kemper to a military school.  In 1885, Johnston added the military training program and structure to Kemper, then changed the name to Kemper Military School in 1899. It was advertised as the "West Point of the West."

Johnston introduced the Standard of Honor in 1915, began a formal ROTC program in 1916, and added a junior college in 1923.  He saw enrollment grow from around 60 in the 1880s and 1890s to 160 by 1910 to 517 in 1918.  In the 1920s enrollment stayed steady at around 350 cadets. In 1928, Colonel Johnston announced his retirement and selected Colonel Arthur M. Hitch, his son-in-law, to lead the school.  Johnston continued as president of Kemper until his death in 1934.

After Hitch's retirement in 1948, T. A. Johnston's son, Colonel Harris Johnston, who had served on the Kemper faculty since 1904, was selected as the new superintendent.

References

 The Life of Prof. F.T. Kemper, by J.A. Quarles. 1882
 The Boonville Daily News, Kemper Centennial Edition, May 8, 1944.

1848 births
1934 deaths
Heads of universities and colleges in the United States
People from Boonville, Missouri